Retouch ( Rutuš) is an Iranian short film directed by Kaveh Mazaheri, which was co-produced by Kaveh Mazaheri and Iranian Youth Cinema Society (IYCS). The film is one of the most successful Iranian short films that won the Best Short Fiction Film Award from the Fajr Film Festival and the best international film festivals such as Tribeca, Krakow, Palm Springs, Stockholm, Ojai, Tirana and Traverse City.
Retouch has enjoyed a successful film festival run, winning at three Oscar qualifying film festivals, including: Tribeca Film Festival (Best Narrative Short), Palm Springs Shortfest (Best Live Action Over 15 Min) and the Krakow Film Festival (Silver Dragon for Best Short Fiction Film).

Plot
Maryam's husband has an accident at home and, rather than saving him, she stops helping and watches him die.

Awards
  Short Waves Festival (Poland 2018)- Winner International Competition 2nd Award
  Tribeca Film Festival (USA 2017)- Winner Best Narrative Short, Winner Jury Prize
  Kraków Film Festival (Poland 2017)- Winner Best Short Fiction Film, Winner Don Quixote Award 
  Palm Springs International ShortFest (USA 2017)- Winner Best Live Action over 15 Minutes
  Fajr Film Festival (Iran 2017)-Winner Best Short Film (Crystal Simorgh Prize)
  Curtas Vila do Conde International Film Festival (Portugal 2017) - Winner Audience Award, Nominated Grand Prize
  Stockholm International Film Festival (Sweden 2017) – Winner Best Short Film
  Traverse City Film Festival (USA 2017) - Winner Best Short Fiction Film 
  Hancheng International Short Film Festival (China 2017) - Winner 3rd Prize for Best Short Film of Silk Road Competition
  Ojai Film Festival (USA 2017) – Winner Best Narrative Short
  Tirana International Film Festival (Albania 2017) – Winner Best Short Fiction
  Wine Country Film Festival-WCFF (USA 2017) – Winner “COURAGE IN CINEMA” AWARD
  Festival Tous Courts (France 2017) – Winner Jury Prize 
  Almería International Film Festival (Spain 2017) – Winner Best Screenplay
  Iranian Film Festival – San Francisco (USA 2017) – Winner Best Screenplay for Short Film 
  Asiana International Short Film Festival (Korea 2017) – Winner Jury Special Mention
  São Paulo International Short Film Festival (Brazil 2017) – Winner Audience Favorite Prize, Nominated Best Film
  Bosphorus International Film Festival (Turkey 2017) – Winner Best International Short Fiction Film
  Moscow International Film Festival (Russia 2017) – Nominated Best Film of the Short Film Competition (Silver St. George) 
  Durban International Film Festival (South Africa 2017)- Nominated Best International Short Film
  Dokufest International Documentary and Short Film Festival (Kosovo 2017) - Nominated Best Fiction Short Film
  Encounters Film Festival (UK 2017) – Nominated Best Film
  Moondance International Film Festival (USA 2017) – Nominated Best Short Film
  Tallgrass Film Festival (USA 2017) – Nominated Best Short Film
  Tacoma Film Festival (USA 2017) – Nominated Best Short Film
  Sedicicorto International Film Festival (Italy 2017) – Nominated Best Short Film
  Chicago International Film Festival (USA 2017) – Nominated Gold Hugo for Best Fiction Short Film
  Valladolid International Film Festival-Seminci (Spain 2017) – Nominated Best Foreign Short at Meeting Point Section

References

External links

2017 films
Iranian drama films
2010s Persian-language films
Films set in Tehran
Films set in Iran